Highway 361 is a provincial highway in the south-east region of the Canadian province of Saskatchewan. It runs from the Manitoba border (continues eastward as Provincial Road 345) to Highway 47.

Highway 361 passes near Fertile, Storthoaks, Nottingham, Alida, Auburnton, Douglaston, Lampman, Luxton, Minard, and Cullen.

Highway 361 connects with Highways 600, 8, 318, 601, 603, 9, 604, 605, and 702, as well as Highway 47.

See also 
Roads in Saskatchewan
Transportation in Saskatchewan

References

External links 

361